Tetsuzan-ike is an earthfill dam located in Tottori prefecture in Japan. The dam is used for irrigation. The catchment area of the dam is  km2. The dam impounds about 2  ha of land when full and can store 51 thousand cubic meters of water. The construction of the dam was completed in 1940.

References

Dams in Tottori Prefecture
1940 establishments in Japan